Kjølnes Lighthouse is a coastal lighthouse located in Berlevåg Municipality in Troms og Finnmark county, Norway.

History
The lighthouse was founded in 1916, but destroyed when the Germans withdrew from Finnmark in the autumn of 1944. It was rebuilt in 1949 based on designs made by the architects Gudolf Blakstad and Herman Munthe-Kaas. The lighthouse has been used as a guest house/rental cottage since 1994 when it was automated and the keeper's house was no longer occupied.

A number of different buildings make up the lighthouse station: lighthouse, machinery hall, boathouse, landings along with multiple residences with outhouses. The residentially functioning buildings are organised around a yard, while the other buildings are situated at a slight distance from this. The light is on from 12 August until 24 April each year. The light is off during the summer due to the midnight sun.

See also

Lighthouses in Norway
List of lighthouses in Norway

References

External links
 Norsk Fyrhistorisk Forening 
 

Lighthouses completed in 1916
Lighthouses in Troms og Finnmark
Listed lighthouses in Norway
Hotels in Norway
Berlevåg